Naphtali Hassan Gale is a South Sudanese politician from Morobo County, a Keliko by tribe. He is a member of Parliament in the Central Equatoria State Parliamentary House representing Lujule West and Wudabi Payams of Morobo County.

He served in the Keliko Bible translation before joining Politics and holding the Position of the Speaker.

Speakership

Central Equatoria State 
He served as Speaker of Central Equatoria State Assembly before the creation of the 32 states in South Sudan when Clement Wani Konga and Juma Malua Ali were the State Governor.

Yei River State 
After the split of the original 10 States of South Sudan into 32 new states, Central Equatoria State was splug into the three States of Jubek, Terekeka and Yei River State. He was then appointed as the Speaker of the Assembly in Yei River State.

References 

People from Central Equatoria
South Sudanese politicians
Year of birth missing (living people)
Living people